Roosevelt Lawayne Brown (born August 3, 1975) is a retired professional baseball player who played outfielder in the Major Leagues from -. He played for the Chicago Cubs in Major League Baseball and the Orix BlueWave in Japan. He is currently the hitting coach for the Sioux Falls Canaries of the American Association of Independent Professional Baseball. His cousin is ex-Boston Red Sox outfielder, Ellis Burks.

External links

1975 births
Living people
Chicago Cubs players
Orix BlueWave players
American expatriate baseball players in Japan
Major League Baseball outfielders
Baseball players from Mississippi
Gulf Coast Braves players
Idaho Falls Braves players
Eugene Emeralds players
Macon Braves players
Kane County Cougars players
Brevard County Manatees players
Daytona Cubs players
West Tennessee Diamond Jaxx players
Iowa Cubs players
Charlotte Knights players
African-American baseball players
21st-century African-American sportspeople
20th-century African-American sportspeople